A perineal dilator is an inflatable balloon-like device sometimes used to create a functional vagina in women with vaginal agenesis.  The device, usually made out of silicone, is inserted into the vagina and inflated.

References

Gynaecology